Jasmeet Kaur Maan, better known as Barbie Maan, is an Indian singer associated with Punjabi music. Maan is best known for singles "Teri Gali" written by Guru Randhawa.

Music career 

Born in Firozpur, Punjab, Maan started her music career with single "Meriyan Saheliyan", which released in August 2018. In June 2020, she finally got her breakthrough with single "Ajj Kal Ve", released by Sidhu Moose Wala. In June 2020, her single "Teri Gali" was released, which featured "Asim Riaz" which was written by Guru Randhawa. The song was viewed over 29 Million times within 1 month of its release on YouTube. On UK Asian music chart by BBC, the song entered top 30, and became Maan's first song to reach the chart.

Discography

Singles

References

External links 

 
 

Punjabi singers

Living people
Punjabi-language singers

Year of birth missing (living people)